Manikpur is a constituency of the Uttar Pradesh Legislative Assembly covering the Manikpur Sarhat town in the Chitrakoot district of Uttar Pradesh, India.

Manikpur is one of five assembly constituencies in the Banda Priyadarshan Tiwari Imo Air-1 Lok Sabha constituency. Since 2008, this assembly constituency is numbered 237 amongst 403 constituencies.

Currently this seat is Vacant.

Election results

2022

2019 Bypoll

2017
R. K. Singh Patel  won in last Assembly election of 2017 Uttar Pradesh Legislative Elections defeating Indian National Congress and Samajwadi Party candidate Sampat Pal by a margin of 44,464 votes.

References

External links
 

Assembly constituencies of Uttar Pradesh
Chitrakoot district